Harbhajan Lakha was an Indian politician. He was elected to the Lok Sabha, the lower house of the Parliament of India from the Phillaur constituency of Punjab as a member of the Bahujan Samaj Party.

References

Year of birth missing
Possibly living people
Bahujan Samaj Party politicians
Lok Sabha members from Punjab, India
India MPs 1989–1991
India MPs 1996–1997
People from Jalandhar district